Italy competed at the 2001 Mediterranean Games in Tunis, Tunisia.

Medals

Athletics

Men

Women

See also
 Athletics at the 2001 Mediterranean Games
 Swimming at the 2001 Mediterranean Games

External links
 Affiche officielle des JM Tunis 2001 

Nations at the 2001 Mediterranean Games
2001
Mediterranean Games